Jönköping County is a county or län in southern Sweden. It borders the counties of Halland, Västra Götaland, Östergötland, Kalmar and Kronoberg. The total county population was 356,291 inhabitants in September 2017. The capital and largest city is Jönköping. About one quarter of the total county population lives in the combined Jönköping-Huskvarna urban area around the southern point of Lake Vättern.

Provinces and administrative history 
Despite being commonly used to indicate the geographical, cultural and historical region, the larger historical province (landskap) of Småland, which most of Jönköping County is part of, has no administrative or political significance today. Jönköping County has existed as an administrative division since the 17th century, and constitutes the north-western part of Småland, the other parts being Kronoberg County in the south-west and Kalmar County in the east. Jönköping County was periodically united with neighbouring Kronoberg County in the single Jönköping and Kronoberg County until 1687. Until the 18th century the administration was housed in the Renaissance fortress at Jönköping Castle, which was demolished in the 19th century; the former site of the castle is still the site of the County Administrative Board building and the Governor's residence.

Habo Municipality and Mullsjö Municipality, from the south-eastern part of the historical province of Västergötland, are since the dissolution of Skaraborg County in 1998 also part of Jönköping County; both municipalities joined Jönköping County as the results of local referendums in 1997.

Administration 

The main aim of the County Administrative Board is to fulfill the goals set in national politics by the Riksdag and the Government, to coordinate the interests and promote the development of the county, to establish regional goals and safeguard the due process of law in the handling of each case. The County Administrative Board is a Government Agency headed by a Governor. The seat of residence for the Governor or Landshövding is the city of Jönköping. See the list of Jönköping Governors.

Politics 
The main responsibilities of the County Council of Jönköping, or Landstinget i Jönköpings län, are the regional public healthcare system and public transport. The County Council Assembly (landstingsfullmäktige), which is the elected body for regional municipal issues, is elected every four years concurrently with the Riksdag elections.

The county's best-known parliamentary representative was the late Olof Palme, leader of the Swedish Social Democratic Party from 1969 to 1986, and twice Prime Minister of Sweden from 1969 to 1976 and from 1982 to 1986.

Jönköping County is the strongest electoral region of the Christian Democrats, who traditionally have a large following among members of evangelical churches in the region. The County Council Assembly and most of the municipalities in the county are governed by liberal-conservative, center-right coalitions. The Social Democrats have historically been strong in mill towns and industrial districts of Jönköping County.

Current representation in the Riksdag (2018–2022)

Riksdag elections 
The table details all Riksdag election results of Jönköping County since the unicameral era began in 1970. The blocs denote which party would support the Prime Minister or the lead opposition party towards the end of the elected parliament.

Governor 

The present acting Governor (landshövding) of Jönköping County is Anneli Wirtén.

Municipalities

Localities in order of size
The ten most populous localities of Jönköping County in 2020:

Foreign background 
SCB have collected statistics on backgrounds of residents since 2002. These tables consist of all who have two foreign-born parents or are born abroad themselves. The chart lists election years and the last year on record alone.

Heraldry 
Jönköping County was formally granted its arms in 1942. By custom it used a combination of the lesser state arms of Sweden and the arms for the town of Jönköping. Blazon for the town of Jönköping: "Gules, a Castle with three towers Argent massoned windowed and gated Sable issuant from a Base wavy Azure".

See also
Småland Runic Inscription 99

References and notes

External links 

County Administrative Board of Jönköping 
County Council of Jönköping 
Regional Development Council of Jönköping County

 

 
Counties of Sweden
Småland
Västergötland
States and territories established in 1687
1687 establishments in Sweden